The Humanist Library in Sélestat is one of the most important cultural treasures of Alsace, France. According to a traditional saying, Alsace has three great treasures: Strasbourg Cathedral, the Isenheim Altarpiece in Colmar and the Humanist Library in Sélestat.
Actually, there are in fact two Renaissance humanist libraries involved, the library of the Humanist School and the private library of the famous scholar, Beatus Rhenanus (1485–1547).

The Library of the Humanist School

In 1441, the municipal authorities of Sélestat appointed Ludwig Dringenberg, born in Westphalia, to be the leader of the local Latin school. The appointment proved to be a stroke of luck. Dringenberg turned out to be a gifted and committed educator, who had an open attitude toward intellectual trends of the time. Under his leadership emerged the first school on the Upper Rhine where Humanist thinking was fostered. His successors, Kraft Hofman (1477–1501), Hieronymus Gebwiler (1501–1509) and Hans Sapidus (1510–1525), knew how to increase the reputation of the school still further. Thus, the school was the training place of an entire generation of Alsatian Humanists. The school also had a library which steadily grew in extent through endowments and gifts (from Jakob Wimpfeling of Sélestat, among others).

Notable alumni 

 Bonifacius Amerbach
 Beatus Rhenanus

The Library of Beatus Rhenanus
Beatus Rhenanus bequeathed his entire private library to his home city of Sélestat. This library contained about 670 bound leather volumes at the time of his death in 1547, which Rhenanus had collected during his studies and his work in Strasbourg, Basel, Paris and Sélestat. Even at that time, the library was of inestimable value, since books were only published in small numbers of copies and they were extremely expensive. The library of Beatus Rhenanus is the only larger Humanist library preserved virtually intact. Other large libraries, such as those of Erasmus von Rotterdam or Johannes Reuchlin, were scattered after the deaths of their owners.

The Library of Beatus Rhenanus was inscribed in the UNESCO's Memory of the World Register in 2011.

The Humanists of Sélestat
The Alsatian Humanists closely associated with the expansion of the library include:
Jakob Wimpfeling (1450–1528), theologian, historian and educator
Martin Butzer (1491–1551), theologian, the "Alsatian Reformer"
Jakob Spiegel (1483–1547), jurist, advisor to Emperor Charles V
Hieronymus Gebwiler (1473–1545), vice-chancellor of the school
Hans Sapidus (1490–1561), vice-chancellor of the school
Jakob Taurellus (1524–1579), advisor to Emperor Ferdinand I

The Library today
Since 1889, both libraries have been housed under a single roof in a former covered market near the Gothic church of Saint George. The library is publicly accessible as a museum and the books can be consulted by scholars and researchers. The collection boasts as many as 550 incunabula, 460 ancient and modern manuscripts, 2,200 16th century prints, 1,600 17th century prints and 2,600 18th century prints, including the Sélestat Lectionary. The rooms also display a collection of 15th and 16th century Upper-Rhenish religious paintings and sculpture.

References

External links
Web site of the library (French)
Web site of the Friends of the Humanist Library Sélestat (with photographs)
R. Dringenberg: Ludwig Dringenberg – ein gelehrter Westfale im Elsass. Essen, 2003 (German, pdf)

Sélestat
Libraries in France
Buildings and structures in Bas-Rhin
Renaissance humanism
Memory of the World Register
Museums in Bas-Rhin
1547 establishments in the Holy Roman Empire
Organizations based in Grand Est
Libraries established in 1547